Mariusz Tubielewicz (born 1978) is a paralympic athlete from Poland competing mainly in category T37 middle-distance events.

Mariusz competed in the 2000 Summer Paralympics in the 800m, 1500m and 5000m but it wasn't until the 2004 Summer Paralympics that he tasted medal success after winning bronze in the 800m and competing in the 1500m.  He also competed in the 2008 Summer Paralympics in the 800m but could not match the bronze medal he won 2004 finishing in seventh place.

References

Paralympic athletes of Poland
Athletes (track and field) at the 2000 Summer Paralympics
Athletes (track and field) at the 2004 Summer Paralympics
Athletes (track and field) at the 2008 Summer Paralympics
Paralympic bronze medalists for Poland
Living people
1978 births
Place of birth missing (living people)
Medalists at the 2004 Summer Paralympics
Paralympic medalists in athletics (track and field)
Polish male middle-distance runners
20th-century Polish people
21st-century Polish people